Liederbach may refer to:

 Liederbach am Taunus, a town in Hesse, Germany
 Liederbach (Main), a river of Hesse, Germany, tributary of the Main

See also

 Unterliederbach, a city district of Frankfurt am Main, Germany